The Algeria women's national handball team is the national team of Algeria. It is governed by the Algerian Handball Federation and takes part in international handball competitions.

Results

World Championship

African Championship

African Games

Mediterranean Games
1979 – 4th
2022 – 8th

Pan Arab Games
1992 – 1st 
1999 – 1st
2011 – 1st

Squad
Roster for the 2013 World Women's Handball Championship.

Head coach: Mourad Ait Ouarab

External links
IHF profile

Women's national handball teams
National team
Women's national sports teams of Algeria